Bristol Rovers Football Club is an English professional association football club based in Bristol, who play in League One, the third tier of the English football league system, as of the 2022-23 season. The club was formed in 1883 under the name Black Arabs F.C. playing their home games at Purdown in Bristol, but they used the name for only a single season, becoming Eastville Rovers and moving to a site known as Three Acres in 1884. Eastville Rovers were somewhat nomadic, moving home in 1891 to the Schoolmaster's Cricket Ground, in 1892 to Durdham Down, and in 1894 to Ridgeway, before finally settling at Eastville Stadium and changing their name to Bristol Eastville Rovers in 1897. Two years later they adopted their current name of Bristol Rovers when they became founder members of the Southern League. They remained at Eastville Stadium for 99 years, before leaving in 1986 when financial pressures meant that they could no longer afford to pay the rent, whereupon they moved to Bath City's Twerton Park, a move that saved the club £30,000 a year. After playing for ten years in Bath, the club returned to Bristol in 1997 when they agreed to share Bristol Rugby's Memorial Stadium. Since joining The Football League in 1920, when the top division of the Southern League effectively became the Football League Third Division, Rovers have spent most of their time in the second and third tiers of the English football league system; the team has never played in the top flight and spent six years, 2001 to 2007, in the fourth tier.

Players

The list of players below includes all team members who have played between 25 and 99 professional league games for Bristol Rovers, which includes games played in the Southern League (1899–1920), Football League (1920–2014 and 2015–) and Football Conference (2014–2015), and also includes substitute appearances.
Statistics are correct as of match played 18 March 2023

Position key:
GK – Goalkeeper; 
DF – Defender;
MF – Midfielder;
FW – Forward

Footnotes
 Unless otherwise stated, all international caps are taken from Byrne & Jay (2003).
 A player's nationality is defined as the country they have represented at the international level if they have done so; otherwise it is their country of birth.
 Playing positions are taken from Byrne & Jay (2003) unless otherwise stated.
 Number of league appearances for Bristol Rovers
 Number of league goals scored for Bristol Rovers
 Unless otherwise stated, player statistics are taken from Byrne & Jay (2003).
 Dwayne Plummer played one unofficial game for the Cayman Islands national team in 2000, before being declared ineligible to represent them. He is English-born.

See also
 List of Bristol Rovers F.C. players
 :Category:Bristol Rovers F.C. players
 Bristol Rovers F.C.#Current squad

References

Bibliography

Bristol Rovers
 25-99
Bristol Rovers players
Association football player non-biographical articles